Velaux is a commune in the Bouches-du-Rhône department in southern France. It is near Coudoux and Ventabren.

Velaux is an old Provençal village set on a hill overlooking the high plains of the inland west side of Aix. It is located in the middle of the Aix-Marseille-Salon region and surrounded by greenery and hills of vines. Velaux is in the countryside while being close to major urban centers in the region.

Population

Sights
Église paroissiale
Tour-musée de Velaux
Moulin Segneurial
Le site archéologique de Roquepertuse
Ciné-club (CCDV)

Sport 
The local football club in Velaux is called US Velaux. It was founded in 1961, and the senior men's team competes in the tenth tier of French football.

See also
Communes of the Bouches-du-Rhône department

References

External links

Communes of Bouches-du-Rhône
Salyes
Bouches-du-Rhône communes articles needing translation from French Wikipedia